Inharrime District is a district of Inhambane Province in southeastern Mozambique. Its principal town is Inharrime. The district is located at the south of the province, and borders with Panda and Homoine Districts in the north, Jangamo District in the northwest, Zavala District in the south, and with Manjacaze District of Gaza Province in west. In the east, the district is bounded by the Indian Ocean. It has a population of 97.471 as of 2007.

Geography

The district is elongated from west to east, between the western border of the province and the ocean. The principal rivers in the district are the Inharime River, the Nhanitande River, the Nhaliuaue River, and the Inhassune River. There are multiple lakes as well.

The climate is tropical semi-arid in the interior and tropical humid at the coast.

History
The name "Inharyni" was recorded by Vasco da Gama during his 1498 Indian expedition; it is not entirely clear whether this is identical to Inharrime, which appears much later in the colonial documents. In 1815, the Portuguese colonial administration was established in Nhamiba, currently Inharrime. Later it was moved to the current location.

Administrative divisions
The district is divided into two postos, Inharrime (three localities) and Mocumbi (two localities).

Demographics
As of 2005, 45% of the population of the district was younger than 15 years. The most common mothertongue among the population was Chopi. 44% were analphabetic, mostly women.

Economy
About 1% of the households in the district have access to electricity.

Agriculture
In the district, there are 18,000 farms which have on average  of land. The main agricultural products are corn, cassava, cowpea, peanut, cotton, and sugar cane.

Transportation
There is a road network in the district which includes a  stretch of the national road EN1, crossing the eastern part of the district.

References

Districts in Inhambane Province